This is a list of regions of Morocco by Human Development Index as of 2023 with data for the year 2021.

References 

Morocco
Morocco
Human Development Index